Iago Díaz Fernández (born 10 February 1993) is a Spanish professional footballer who plays for Recreativo de Huelva mainly as a left winger.

Club career
Born in Barcelona, Catalonia, Díaz joined CD Lugo's youth setup in 2007, aged 14, after starting out at Prone Lugo AD. In late 2011 he made his debut as a senior with the former, coming on as a late substitute for Félix Quero in a 2–2 away draw against Rayo Vallecano B in the Segunda División B.

Díaz scored his first goal on 4 March 2012, his side's last in a 2–2 home draw with another reserve team, Sporting de Gijón B. He finished the season with 13 games as the Galicians promoted to Segunda División for the second time in their history, and signed a new three-year contract in the summer.

Díaz made his debut as a professional on 18 August 2012, replacing Diego Tonetto in a 1–0 home victory over Hércules CF. He scored his first goal in the second tier on 17 November, but in a 1–2 loss to Girona FC also at the Estadio Anxo Carro.

On 22 March 2014, Díaz scored the first in a 2–0 home defeat of Recreativo de Huelva, being also the club's 100th goal in division two. On 20 December, he contributed a brace to the 6–6 draw at CD Numancia.

On 8 June 2015, Díaz signed a three-year deal with UD Almería also in the second tier. On 27 January 2017, he was loaned to Cultural y Deportiva Leonesa until the end of the third-division campaign.

Díaz cut ties with the Andalusians on 17 August 2017, and signed for SD Ponferradina just hours later. He continued competing in the third division the following years, with Recreativo and CF Rayo Majadahonda.

Honours
Cultural Leonesa
Segunda División B: 2016–17

References

External links

1993 births
Living people
Spanish footballers
Footballers from Barcelona
Association football wingers
Segunda División players
Segunda División B players
Segunda Federación players
CD Lugo players
UD Almería players
Cultural Leonesa footballers
SD Ponferradina players
Recreativo de Huelva players
CF Rayo Majadahonda players
Real Avilés CF footballers